Ronald Wolf (born December 30, 1938) is the former American football general manager (GM) of the National Football League's Green Bay Packers. Wolf is widely credited with bringing success to a Packers franchise that had rarely won during the two decades prior to Wolf joining the organization. He also played a significant role in personnel operations with the Oakland and Los Angeles Raiders from 1963 to 1975 and again from 1978 to 1990. He joined Green Bay's front office in November 1991 from a personnel director's job with the New York Jets. He was inducted into the Pro Football Hall of Fame in August 2015.

Biography

Early life
Wolf was born in New Freedom, Pennsylvania on December 30, 1938. After serving three years in the Army, Wolf played college baseball at Maryville College in Tennessee. After college, he worked for Pro Football Illustrated, a Chicago sports newspaper.

Oakland/Los Angeles Raiders
Wolf became a scout for the Raiders in 1963. With the Raiders, Wolf took part in drafting such notable players as Art Shell, Gene Upshaw, Ken Stabler, and Jack Tatum, all of whom would play for the Super Bowl XI Championship team in 1976, and later such players as Howie Long, Marcus Allen, and Matt Millen, all of the Super Bowl XVIII Championship team in 1983, the then Los Angeles Raiders.

After the death of Raiders owner Al Davis, Wolf was rumored to possibly come back to Oakland. He didn't specify that he wanted to have a full-time job as General Manager there, but he told the new ownership team that he would assist them with anything they needed. In an interview with the Milwaukee Journal Sentinel he supported Green Bay Packers director of football operations, Reggie McKenzie as a perfect candidate for the GM position in Oakland and called him a "tremendous evaluator" when it comes to finding players.

Tampa Bay Buccaneers
In 1975, Wolf joined the expansion Tampa Bay Buccaneers as vice-president of operations. He helped build the team that would advance to the 1979 NFC Championship game. He would not be around to see his team develop, however, as he resigned his position with the Buccaneers in February, 1978, citing "personal matters". It is believed that he had difficulty working with Buccaneer owner Hugh Culverhouse, and that Culverhouse was trying to interfere with personnel decisions. Wolf later indicated that Culverhouse's close personal relationship with and strong financial stake in coach John McKay meant that Wolf had to be the one to pay with his job for the team's 0-26 start. Wolf returned to the Raiders on the expiration of his Buccaneer contract.

Green Bay Packers
In 1991, Wolf was hired to replace Packers General Manager Tom Braatz. Wolf's first major decisions were to fire head coach Lindy Infante, hire then-San Francisco 49ers offensive coordinator Mike Holmgren to replace him, and to trade for then-Atlanta Falcons backup quarterback Brett Favre.  In 1993, Wolf signed the most sought after free-agent available, Reggie White, bringing in a team leader and defensive superstar. This signing, in NFL free agency's first year, also made Green Bay a more desirable destination for future potential free agents, including White's fellow defensive linemen Santana Dotson and Sean Jones. Specifically, White's arrival negated the perception of Green Bay as a city where African-American players did not feel welcome.  With White and cast-off Gilbert Brown, Dotson and Jones formed the heart of the Packer defense during the team's championship run.

Wolf is credited with remaking the Packers into a perennial winner and championship contender. From 1968 to 1991, the Packers had only four winning seasons. Over his nine-year term as GM, the Packers compiled a 92–52 record, good for a .639 winning percentage, second in the NFL over that span to the San Francisco 49ers. The Packers won Super Bowl XXXI against the New England Patriots, lost in Super Bowl XXXII to the Denver Broncos, and made the playoffs six straight times. Wolf announced he would retire as Packers GM in February 2001. He stayed on through the April NFL draft and officially retired as Packers GM in June 2001. Afterward the Packers head coach at that time, Mike Sherman, assumed his duties as GM.

His son, Eliot Wolf, served as the Cleveland Browns' assistant general manager position from 2018 to 2019.

San Diego Chargers
On December 31, 2012, San Diego Chargers President Dean Spanos retained Wolf as a consultant to advise the Chargers throughout the general manager and head coach hiring process.

New York Jets
From 1990 to 1991, Wolf served as personnel director for the New York Jets.

On December 28, 2014, Wolf later joined Charley Casserly as a consultant for the Jets in their search for a new head coach and general manager, following the firing of Rex Ryan and John Idzik Jr.

Pro Football Hall of Fame
On October 22, 2014, Wolf was selected as a finalist to be a member in the Pro Football Hall of Fame as a contributor (designation for individuals who were neither a player nor a coach).

On January 31, 2015, Wolf was confirmed as a member of the 2015 Hall of Fame class. He was inducted on August 8.

References

Place of birth missing (living people)
1938 births
Living people
Green Bay Packers general managers
Los Angeles Raiders executives
New York Jets executives
Oakland Raiders executives
San Diego Chargers executives
Tampa Bay Buccaneers executives
National Football League general managers
Pro Football Hall of Fame inductees
People from New Freedom, Pennsylvania
Jewish American sportspeople
21st-century American Jews